The 2000 World Juniors Track Cycling Championships were the 26th annual Junior World Championships for track cycling held in Fiorenzuola d'Arda, Italy in August 2000.

The Championships had six events for men (1 kilometre time trial, Points race, Individual pursuit, Team pursuit, Sprint and Team sprint) and four for women (500 metre time trial, Points race, Individual pursuit and Sprint).

Events

Medal table

References

UCI Juniors Track World Championships
2000 in track cycling
2000 in Italian sport